Zhuangjiashan is a small village in Dongguan, northern Ju County, Shandong province, China. In 1988, a site containing historical relics of the Shang Dynasty was discovered 50 meters to the south of the village.

References

Villages in China
Ju County